The Australia cricket team toured South Africa between February and April 2002 to play three Test and seven ODI matches. Australia won the Test series 2–1 and the ODI series 5–1.

Tour matches

Three-day match: South Africa A v Australians

Four-day match: South Africa A v Australians

Test series

1st Test

2nd Test

3rd Test

ODI series

1st ODI

2nd ODI

3rd ODI

4th ODI

5th ODI

6th ODI

7th ODI

Notes

References

External links
 Series home at ESPN Cricinfo

2002 in Australian cricket
2002 in South African cricket
International cricket competitions in 2001–02
Australian cricket tours of South Africa